GeoXACML stands for Geospatial eXtensible Access Control Markup Language. It defines a geo-specific extension to XACML Version 2.0, as it was ratified by OASIS standards organization on 1 February 2005.

GeoXACML version 1.0.1 is standardized by the Open Geospatial Consortium (OGC).

Markup languages
XML-based standards
Geographic information systems